There are many Automobile manufacturers that are mostly regional, or operating in niche markets. The list below are several examples of the "smaller" car companies.

Automotive industry
Motor vehicle manufacturers